The 2012 United States presidential election in Oklahoma took place on November 6, 2012, as part of the 2012 United States presidential election in which all 50 states plus the District of Columbia participated. Voters chose seven electors to represent them in the Electoral College via a popular vote pitting incumbent Democratic President Barack Obama and his running mate, Vice President Joe Biden, against Republican challenger and former Massachusetts Governor Mitt Romney and his running mate, Congressman Paul Ryan. For the third election in a row since 2004, no third parties were allowed on the ballot.

Oklahoma in recent years has become one of the most conservative states in the nation. For the third cycle in a row, the Republicans won over 65% of the vote and swept every single county in the state.

With 66.77% of the popular vote to Obama's mere 33.23%, Mitt Romney, carried almost exactly 2/3 of the Oklahoma electorate while Barack Hussein Obama merely carried 1/3. Oklahoma was Romney's third strongest state in the 2012 election after Utah and Wyoming.

Primaries

Democratic

President Obama faced four challengers in Oklahoma's Democratic primary. Challenger Randall Terry took 12 counties with candidate Jim Rogers winning in three counties. Candidates Bob Ely and Darcy Richardson also appeared on Oklahoma's ballot but failed to obtain a majority of votes in any county.

Republican
The Republican primary took place on Super Tuesday, March 6, 2012.

Oklahoma has 43 delegates to the 2012 Republican National Convention. Three super delegates are unbound by the primary results. 15 delegates are allocated by congressional districts, 3 delegates for each district. If a candidate gets a majority in the district, he takes all 3 delegates; if no one gets a majority, the delegates are split either 2-to-1 or 1-1-1 depending on how many candidates get at least 15% of the vote. Another 25 delegates are awarded to the candidate who wins a majority in the state, or allocated proportionately among candidates winning at least 15% of the vote statewide if no one gets majority.

Results

Republican Conventions for Oklahoma's Congressional Districts
Fifteen delegates to the 2012 Republican national convention were elected at congressional-district conventions March 31 to April 14, 2012 — three from each of Oklahoma's five congressional districts.

Oklahoma Republican Convention
The Oklahoma Republican State Convention was held May 11–12, 2012 in Norman.  Irregularities were reported.

At least two Ron Paul supporters said they were physically attacked by Romney supporters.

Oklahoma's (Republican) Governor Mary Fallin tried to speak at the convention.  After loud chants of "Ron Paul" from the floor, she stated (referring to Romney) "We have a presidential nominee", resulting in loud booing.

Paul supporters said that the convention was stopped with unfinished business, without a two-thirds vote, and therefore against parliamentary procedure.  It was reported that, after the convention was said to be adjourned, a partition in the room was moved, isolating many attendees from the rest of the body.  The lights were turned out momentarily.

After the convention was stopped and the chairman left, many Paul supporters assembled outside and held a rump convention, chaired by Jake Peters, at which they elected a slate of Paul supporters as delegates to the national convention.

Four Paul supporters, including Jake Peters, made a formal complaint to the Oklahoma Republican Party, saying that Party rules were broken by failing to take a roll-call vote on the delegate slate and that the convention was adjourned without the required vote.  The complaint asserted that state law is involved in the Republican Party's nominating process and cited case law to the effect that party process should be considered "an integral part of the State's election system".

General election

Results

By county

Note: The Oklahoma SoS website only lists the Democrat and Republican results. No third-party results are available.

By congressional district
Romney won all 5 congressional districts.

Analysis
As expected, Mitt Romney swept every county in the state, carrying 66.77% of the vote to Obama's measly 33.23%. Romney capitalized on his strength amongst white and conservative voters – Oklahoma's population is 65.6% white (a demographic Romney won nationwide by 59% to Obama's 39%) and the state has a Cook Partisan Voting Index of R+20, tied for the second most Republican in the nation along with Utah. His strongest performance was in the Oklahoma Panhandle, one of the most staunchly conservative regions in the country, where he garnered 80% to 90% of the vote in many of these counties. Romney also performed well in the Little Dixie region and on the state's border with Texas. Despite many counties having a plurality of registered Democratic voters exceeding the number of registered Republicans (such as Comanche and Okmulgee), Obama failed to carry any counties. However, Obama was still able to garner margins of around 45% to Romney's 55% in some counties, such as Cherokee County (Obama's best performance), which is 36.4% Native American and home to the capital of the Cherokee Nation, Tahlequah, and Muskogee County, which is located in the Creek Nation. He also had a formidable, but still lackluster, performance in Oklahoma County, home to the state's capital and largest city, Oklahoma City, which is quite conservative despite being the state's most urban region.

See also
 United States presidential elections in Oklahoma
 2012 Republican Party presidential debates and forums
 2012 Republican Party presidential primaries
 Results of the 2012 Republican Party presidential primaries
 Oklahoma Republican Party

References

External links
The Green Papers: for Oklahoma
The Green Papers: Major state elections in chronological order

2012
United States President
Oklahoma